Ticholeptus is an extinct genus of oreodont endemic to North America during the Middle Miocene epochs (16.0—13.6 mya), existing for approximately . Fossils have been uncovered throughout the U.S. from Florida to Oregon, as well as California, and numerous sites in Nebraska, Nevada, and Montana.

References

Oreodonts
Miocene mammals of North America
Miocene even-toed ungulates
Serravallian extinctions
Burdigalian first appearances
Prehistoric even-toed ungulate genera